Tito Junco refers to:

 Tito Junco (Cuban actor) (1944–2003)
 Tito Junco (Mexican actor) (1913-1983)